Burdine is an unincorporated community and coal town in Letcher County, Kentucky, United States. Their  post office  operated in Burdine from 1907 to 1911.

Climate
The climate in this area is characterized by relatively high temperatures and evenly distributed precipitation throughout the year.  The Köppen Climate System describes the weather as humid subtropical, and uses the abbreviation Cfa.

References

Unincorporated communities in Letcher County, Kentucky
Unincorporated communities in Kentucky
Coal towns in Kentucky